Foxes is a 1980 American coming-of-age drama film directed by Adrian Lyne, in his feature film directorial debut, and written by Gerald Ayres. The film stars Jodie Foster, Scott Baio, Sally Kellerman, Randy Quaid, and Cherie Currie, in her acting debut. It revolves around a group of teenage girls coming of age in suburban Los Angeles toward the end of the disco era.

Foxes was theatrically released on February 29, 1980, by United Artists. The film was Foster's penultimate major film appearance before taking a sabbatical from acting to attend Yale. It received several positive reviews from critics. The film grossed $7.5 million in North America and earned a cult following.

Plot
A group of four teenage girls in the San Fernando Valley during the end of the 1970s have painful emotional troubles. Deirdre is a disco queen who is fascinated by her sexuality, likes boys and has many relationship troubles. Madge is unhappily overweight and angry that she is still a virgin. Her parents are overprotective, and she has an annoying younger sister. Annie is a teenage runaway who drinks, uses drugs, and runs away from her abusive police officer father. Jeanie feels she has to take care of them all, is fighting with her divorced mother who cycles through different boyfriends and is yearning for a closer relationship with her distant father, a tour manager for the rock band Angel.

The girls believe school is a waste of time, their boyfriends are immature, and that they are alienated from the adults in their lives. All four seem immersed in the decadence of the late 1970s. The only way for them to loosen up and forget the bad things happening in their lives is to party and have fun. Annie is the least responsible, while Jeanie is ready to grow up and wants to stop acting like a child. Jeanie is most worried about Annie and continually takes risks to try to keep Annie clean and safe. Annie's unstable behavior keeps everyone on edge, and finally leads to her death in an automobile accident.

Annie's death brings changes for the rest of the girls. Madge marries Jay, an older man who deflowered her; Deirdre no longer acts boy crazy; and Jeanie graduates from high school and is about to head off to college. After Madge and Jay's wedding, Jeanie visits Annie's grave and smokes a cigarette. With a smile, she muses that Annie wanted to be buried under a pear tree, "not in a box or anything", so that each year her friends could come by, have a pear and say, "Annie's tastin' good this year, huh?"

Cast

Production
The film was based on a script by Gerald Ayers, who was better known at the time for being a producer of such films as The Last Detail and Cisco Pike. He decided to move into screenwriting and had written what would become Rich and Famous before writing Foxes.

Ayers says he started with the question "what would happen if you dropped Louisa May Alcott into the San Fernando Valley today? She would have a different story to tell."

He pitched the concept to Twentieth Century Fox who agreed to develop a script. Ayers went out and interviewed "around 40 girls" starting March 1977 and finished a first draft by November 1977. "It isn't so much a duplication of the characters in Alcott as it is suggested by them," said Ayers. "Beth for example instead of being introverted has become quite extroverted."

The original title was Twentieth Century Foxes.  Fox passed on the script and the project wound up with producer David Puttnam, who had a deal with Casablanca Pictures, for whom he had made Midnight Express. Puttnam said "when I first came out here [Los Angeles] I was fascinated by Beverly Hills teenagers particularly with the problem of suicide. Gerry's script doesn't deal with that but it does touch on a lot of contemporary issues."

Casablanca agreed to finance under its deal with United Artists. Filming started 16 October 1978 and wrapped in January 1979.

The film was the feature directorial debut from Adrian Lyne. Producer David Puttnam had enjoyed success hiring debutant directors with a background in TV commercials (Ridley Scott, Alan Parker, Hugh Hudson) and that is where Lyne came from.

Reception
The film grossed $7.5 million domestically. It received an approval rating of 70% from 10 reviews of Rotten Tomatoes.

Noted film critic Roger Ebert gave the film a good review, writing:

DVD
Foxes was released in a Region 1 DVD by Metro-Goldwyn-Mayer on August 5, 2003. A Blu-ray edition of the film was released by Kino Lorber on January 15, 2015.

Soundtrack

Awards

Nominations
Young Artist Awards
Nominee: Best Young Actress Starring in a Motion Picture – Jodie Foster

References

External links
 
 
 
 
 

1980 films
1980s coming-of-age drama films
1980s teen drama films
American coming-of-age drama films
American teen drama films
1980s English-language films
Films about drugs
Films directed by Adrian Lyne
Films produced by David Puttnam
Films scored by Giorgio Moroder
Films set in 1979
Films set in the San Fernando Valley
United Artists films
1980 directorial debut films
1980 drama films
American female buddy films
1980s female buddy films
1980s American films